It's a Cool, Cool Christmas is a Christmas charity compilation album released in 2000 by Xfm on Jeepster Records in aid of The Big Issue. The album includes a mixture of traditional Christmas songs and original songs with a Christmas theme.

Reception

Allmusic writer Tim DiGravina described the album as "inspired good fun", calling it "without a doubt, one of the better alternative, holiday collections."

According to DiGravina, Grandaddy's "Alan Parsons in a Winter Wonderland," with its lyric about building a snowman and pretending that it is Alan Parsons, "might be the funniest song from 2000". The BBC's Richard Banks called "Alan Parsons" "a stroke of comedy genius". Scott Miller, in his book Music: What Happened?, suggested that Grandaddy "probably deserve immortality" just for this song. Ireland's public broadcasting network, RTÉ, called the Grandaddy song "downright silly", while Exclaim! called it "one of our favourite indie rock Christmas tunes ever".

Six By Seven's "I Believe in Father Christmas" was described by DiGravina as "some sort of post-modern classic".

"O Come, O Come Emmanuel", contributed by Belle and Sebastian, was described by RTÉ as a "beautiful ethereal version".

Track listing

Notes
Track 2 previously released in the US on the compilation It's Finally Christmas
Track 4 appears as a B side on the single "Cancer for the Cure"
Track 5 from the album NoELVEZsi
Track 6 "Christmas in Hawaii" from the album Tino's Breaks Volume 3 - Christmas.
Track 11 appears as a B side on the single "I Was Born on Christmas Day"
Track 19 appears as a B side on the single "Let's Get Together (In Our Minds)"
Track 20 previously released on the EP Christmas

See also 
Charity album

References

External links 
 https://web.archive.org/web/20070519233047/http://www.jeepster.co.uk/site/

Christmas compilation albums
2000 Christmas albums
2000 compilation albums
Jeepster Records compilation albums
Alternative rock Christmas albums